Murray Harman is a television and film actor from Australia, best known for his role as Murray the Cop in the black comedy series Pizza and Murray Smith (an office worker and cop) Swift and Shift Couriers.

Collection of works

Filmography

Television
Pizza (as Murray the Cop) (2000–2007)
All Saints (as Security Guard in S5E11 & S5E14) (2002)
White Collar Blue (as Fireman in S2E19) (2003)
Dangerous (as Bus Driver in S1E2) (2007)
Swift and Shift Couriers (as Murray Smith) (2008, 2011)
Housos (as Richard Head) (2011, 2013)
Fat Pizza: Back in Business (as Richard Head) (2019)

External links

Australian male actors
Living people
Year of birth missing (living people)